Mareca is a genus or subgenus of ducks in the family Anatidae that includes the wigeons.

The species now placed in this genus were formerly placed in the genus Anas. A molecular phylogentic study comparing mitochondrial DNA sequences published in 2009 found that the genus Anas, as then defined, was not monophyletic. Based on the published phylogeny, the genus Anas was split into four monophyletic genera with five extant species moved into the resurrected genus Mareca.

The genus Mareca was introduced by English naturalist James Francis Stephens in 1824.  The type species is the Eurasian wigeon. The name of the genus is from the Portuguese word Marreco for a small duck.

Extant species
The genus Mareca contains these species:

Fossils

Phylogeny
Cladogram based on the analysis of Gonzalez and colleagues published in 2009.

References

 
Bird genera